The Diefenbunker, formerly known by its military designation, Canadian Forces Station Carp (CFS Carp), is a large underground four-storey reinforced concrete bunker and nuclear fallout shelter located in the rural area of Carp, Ontario approximately  west of downtown Ottawa.  Between 1957 and 1961, during the Cold War the Government of Canada led by then Prime Minister John Diefenbaker authorized the Diefenbunker to be designed and built as the Central Emergency Government Headquarters (CEGHQ Carp) in an attempt to ensure the continuity of government subsequent to a nuclear weapons attack by the Soviet Union.  In 1994, CFS Carp was decommissioned and closed.

In 1994, the Diefenbunker was designated a National Historic Site of Canada because it is considered the most important surviving Cold War site in Canada.  The bunker is important as an engineering achievement and to the critical path method of planning used in its construction.  In addition, the Diefenbunker is symbolic of the Cold War, a strategy of nuclear deterrence and the Canadian people's determination to survive as a nation following a nuclear war. The Historic Sites and Monuments Board of Canada (HSMBC) plaque located at the Diefenbunker states:

In 1998, the facility was re-opened as a museum called the "Diefenbunker: Canada's Cold War Museum" allowing the general public year-round access to tour the facility.

History

In 1958, at the height of the Cold War and the infancy of the intercontinental ballistic missile (ICBM) threat, Prime Minister John Diefenbaker authorized the creation of close to 50 Emergency Government Headquarters (nicknamed "Diefenbunkers" by opposition parties) across Canada. These shelters were part of what came to be known as the Continuity of Government plan, which was meant to protect various members of government in the event of a nuclear attack.

An abandoned gravel pit outside Carp was selected instead, construction began in 1959 and was completed by 1962.

The Carp shelter would be the largest of such facilities (over ) and the only one in the immediate Ottawa area. The underground 4-storey bunker required 32,000 tonnes of concrete and 5,000 tonnes of steel. It had massive blast doors at the surface, as well as extensive air filters to prevent radiation infiltration. Although supposedly effective against surface nuclear detonations, the facility was later found to be vulnerable to conventional Bunker buster bombs developed after its construction, as these bombs had time delay fuses that would detonate after they had penetrated deeply enough underground.

Underground storage was built for food, fuel, fresh water, and other supplies. The bunker was built to accommodate 565 people for up to one month without receiving additional supplies from the outside. It included an emergency broadcast studio for the Canadian Broadcasting Corporation and a vault on the lowest level to hold the gold reserves of the Bank of Canada.

These facilities were administered by the Royal Canadian Corps of Signals (later the Communications and Electronics Branch). A decentralized transmitter site, the Richardson Detachment, with numerous transmitter antenna was located further to the west near Perth Ontario that was supported from a 2-storey underground facility of similar construction to the Carp facility but much smaller. Two radio receiving facilities, the CFS Carp Almonte Detachment and CFS Carp Dunrobin Detachment, with a complete receiving antenna arrays were built in the region but all buildings were above ground.

Diefenbunker, Canada's Cold War Museum

CFS Carp was decommissioned in 1994 following the reduction in the ICBM threat.

From 1959 to 1994, the site was owned and operated by the Government of Canada, Department of National Defence. After the local municipality took control of the facility in 1994, the community took a great interest in the bunker, requesting access to public tours of the facility. The local municipality took control of the facility and a group of local volunteers, recognizing the heritage and tourism value of the Carp Diefenbunker, undertook to open the facility as a cold war museum and conduct public tours. It was purchased by the Diefenbunker Development Group in 1998, and officially opened as a museum. The name of the facility was changed to the Diefenbunker, Canada's Cold War Museum shortly thereafter. It is currently open year-round for public tours.

Many areas of the bunker, including the PM's Suite, the Emergency Government Situation Centre, the CBC Emergency Broadcasting Studio, the Military Federal Warning Centre, the External Affairs Ministerial Office, the Public Works Minister's Office and the Bank of Canada Vault, are being restored to their operational condition. The rest of the 358 rooms have been converted to exhibits of the Cold War era.

Growth of the Museum

Upon its opening in 1998, the museum was run completely by volunteers. However, the 5,000 visitors received that year was too much to be handled solely by volunteers.

In 1999, the museum's second year of operation, a curator was hired along with some students. The museum's visitation doubled to 10,000 people that year.

The museum continued to grow into the 2000s. Close to 15,000 visitors passed through the Diefenbunker in 2000. Additional part-time staff was hired throughout the year to keep up with museum maintenance and upkeep. As of 2008, the Diefenbunker averages approximately 25,000 visitors each year. Four full-time staff, nine part-time staff and numerous volunteers work to keep the museum running smoothly. In 2012, the museum had 45,280 visitors. This was one of the highest increases in attendance other than the opening year of the Bunker. In 2017, Canada's sesquicentennial, the Diefenbunker welcomed 88,000 visitors through its blast doors. Since March 2016, the museum has also hosted an escape room that they state is the world's largest.

The mandate of Diefenbunker, Canada's Cold War museum is "to increase throughout Canada and the world, interest in and a critical understanding of the Cold War, by preserving the Diefenbunker as a national historic site, and operating a Cold War Museum.

Collections and research
The Diefenbunker houses a collection of Cold War artefacts, an archive and a library, all of which are made available to researchers upon request, and to the general public through the exhibitions.

Funding
The Diefenbunker: Canada's Cold War museum is a not-for-profit, charitable museum. It is funded privately; the main source of revenue for the museum comes from admission sales (approximately 75% of total revenue). The Diefenbunker actively applies for private, municipal, provincial and federal grants. The museum also relies on the generous support of the community through donations and sponsorship.

Additional services
The Diefenbunker offers additional services on top of public tours. The museum has space available to rent both for events and storage. The decommissioned bunker has been used as a movie set on several occasions, including for The Sum of All Fears and Rulers of Darkness.

Further reading
 Matthews, Sara and Anstett, Justin. (2015). Finding Diefenbunker: Canadian Nationalism and Cold War Memory. Wilfrid Laurier University Press.

See also
 Edenvale Transmitter Station Bunker, twin of the Diefenbunker, closed in 2005.
 Nuclear War Survival Skills, by Cresson Kearny, is a civil defence manual.
 Protect and Survive, a United Kingdom government public information campaign on civil defence for a nuclear war. 
 Survival Under Atomic Attack, a United States government booklet released during the Cold War.

References

External links

 Diefenbunker Museum
 Federal Nuclear Emergency Plan Part 1: Master Plan

Canadian Forces bases in Canada (closed)
Canadian Forces bases in Ontario
Cold War military installations
Cold War museums in Canada
Continuity of government
Designated heritage properties in Ontario
Emergency management in Canada
Museums in Ottawa
National Historic Sites in Ontario
Nuclear bunkers in Canada